Yuval Zaliouk (יובל צליוק, born 1939 in Haifa) is an Israeli-American conductor.

Born into a musical family, he was educated at the Haifa Academy of Music where he studied piano, trombone and percussion.  He subsequently received a law degree from the Hebrew University, Jerusalem.  He studied conducting Mendi Rodan, Sir Colin Davis, Jascha Horenstein, and Otto Klemperer.

From 1966 to 1970 he was as Permanent Conductor of the  Royal Ballet, London.   In 1975, Zaliouk was instrumental in the revival of Israel’s Haifa Symphony Orchestra, and was the orchestra’s Music Director until 1978. He was also Interim Principal Conductor the Edmonton Symphony Orchestra in 1980-1981.  From 1980 to 1989, Zaliouk was Music Director of the Toledo Symphony Orchestra, and subsequently was appointed Conductor Laureate of the orchestra.
From 1996 to 2001, Zaliouk was the Music Director of the Ra'anana Symphonette Orchestra in Israel.

Prizes and awards 
1965  First Prize, America Israel Cultural Foundation Conductors Competition
1967  First Prize, International Besançon Competition for Young Conductors
1970  Second Prize, Dimitri Mitropoulos Conducting Competition, New York
1984  ASCAP Award for Adventurous Programming of Contemporary Music (Toledo Symphony)

References

External links 
Yuval Zaliouk biography

Israeli conductors (music)
Living people
Year of birth missing (living people)
Israeli emigrants to the United States
21st-century conductors (music)